Stretching over 3600 km (2236 miles) from Prince Township, west of Sault Ste. Marie, to the Quebec border, the Great Lakes Waterfront Trail is a signed route of interconnecting roads and off-road trails joining over 150 communities and First Nations along the Canadian shores of the Great Lakes and St. Lawrence River. A celebration of nature and culture, the Great Lakes Waterfront Trail is part of a strategy to protect and connect people to the largest group of freshwater lakes on earth. It is a legacy project of the Waterfront Regeneration Trust, a charity, and its community partners. Through Toronto, the trail is called the Martin Goodman Trail. The Waterfront Trail is also used by commuters in parts of Southern Ontario.

Expansion and future plans 
In October 2013, Premier of Ontario Kathleen Wynne announced government support for expansion of the trail system to better connect the 2015 Pan Am Games venues and community.

I want to ensure that all of the people of this province benefit from our investments in the Pan Am and Parapan Am Games, because that is how we can grow as One Ontario. Extending our trails system and connecting more communities is a great way for the excitement of the Games to live on well beyond 2015.
— Kathleen Wynne, Premier of Ontario, October 3, 2013

The announcement ensures that "the province will work with First Nation and Métis communities and organizations to incorporate Aboriginal markers along the trails to honour the history and culture of Aboriginal communities in Ontario."

Trails will connect to four major Pan Am and Parapan Am Games venues – CIBC Pan Am/Parapan Am Athletes' Village, CIBC Pan Am Park, CIBC Hamilton Soccer Stadium and Pan Am/Parapan Am Fields.

All consultations related to Pan Am/Parapan Am trails will address accessibility requirements under the Accessibility for Ontarians with Disabilities Act.

In November 2013, two waterfront-design firms were selected to reimagine the space at the former Ontario Place grounds in Toronto to incorporate a broader mandate for greenspace and parkland.

Since 2013, the Trail has been growing radically, with expansions along the shores of Lake Erie, Lake Huron, Georgian Bay and Lake Huron's north channel, adding over 2000 km to its length.

Uses
The rising cost of automobiles and gasoline mean a heavier burden on the trail system from multiple uses.

 Walking/Hiking
 Running
 Cycling
 Inline skating
 Skateboarding
 Mobility scooters
 Mountain biking

Controversial decisions to limit some e-bike and mobility scooters have been underway along portions of the trail.

Cities

Regional Municipalities connected by the Great Lakes Waterfront Trail

 Frontenac County
 Northumberland County
 Regional Municipality of Durham
 Region Of Peel
 Niagara Region
 Essex County
 Lambton County
 Huron County
 Bruce County
 Grey County
 Simcoe County
 Muskoka District

Notable waypoints
The rise of social travel and photography have parallelled with the rise of smaller wearable technological advancements that permits travelers along the trail a variety of activities and destinations.

Toronto Harbourfront
 Location: 

The jewel of the Waterfront Trail lies at the Toronto Islands Ferry Terminal where trail users can catch a ferry to the expansive Toronto Islands including Centre Island and
Hanlon's Point Beach.  In 2015, the Waterfront Trail is expected to connect to the huge underground Toronto PATH system.  Cyclists and skaters are encouraged on the peaceful island where only utility vehicles are permitted.

Among the artistic touches of this portion of the trail include the architecturally renowned Wave Decks, designed by West8.

The Beaches
 Location: 

The Beaches community in eastern Toronto is an important location on the trail, being one of the only neighbourhoods in Toronto with residential homes next to the lakeshore. The Beach itself is a popular destination, hosting games of beach volleyball, and attracting many cyclists and rollerbladers. North of the waterfront are many small stores and restaurants along Queen Street and The Danforth. From the Beaches, the trail, called the Martin Goodman Trail, runs west along the Toronto waterfront for its entire length, with only a few sections on city streets. Currently, there isn't any path running east along the waterfront from the Beaches.

Sugar Beach
Sugar Beach is a former parking lot located at Lower Jarvis Street and Queen's Quay—the park is now a non-swimming beach on the south-eastern edge of South Core, Toronto.

Port Credit
 Location: 

Port Credit straddles the Credit River with a mix of residential and commercial development along the trail. Most of the trail is separated from traffic with the exception of some residential streets at the east end near the Adamson Estate.

Spencer Smith Park

 Location: 

Spencer Smith Park at Burlington is a prime example of the evolution of mixed-use development and city planning in the Greater Toronto Area. In 2013, a new pier was opened by the City of Burlington that anchors the trail along the shores of the lake.

Spencer Smith Park hosts the annual Sound Of Music festival, a longtime tradition and celebration for Halton and surrounding areas.

1000 Islands
 Location: 

The 1000 Islands Bikepath is a 37 kilometre trail running parallel to the Parkway between Gananoque and Brockville, forming a section of the Waterfront Trail.

Ontario Place
In July 2014, the provincial government of Ontario announced a $100 million renovation plan that will see the transformation of Ontario Place from an entertainment venue into a huge mixed-use park that will anchor the trail in this section.

Cycling on the trail

Not all sections of the Great Lakes Waterfront Trail are off-road. The route is designated with existing infrastructure in place with the goal of future improvements, including a legacy goal of a completely off-road trail, as close to the water's edge as ecologically feasible. There is an effort by the Waterfront Regeneration Trust, the charity leading the partnership of communities the Trail connects, to expand and improve the route. Their partnership with local, regional, and Provincial governments has yielded several successes, including the Ministry of Transportation's addition of paved shoulders on roughly 50km of Highway 17 between Sault Ste Marie and Greater Sudbury, where the route could use no other roads.

The Waterfront Regeneration Trail is focused on creating a cycling route around the Great Lakes, and has big expansion plans and dreams for the coming years to increase significantly its mileage.

Some of the biggest deterrents for cycle tourists are poor road conditions that force cyclists into traffic and a lack of good signage.

Facts and figures 
Length 
 Over 3000 km (2236 miles) designated (signed)
 700 km (434 miles) undesignated on a 2018-2020 expansion route between Collingwood and Sudbury,
 Roughly 50km (31 miles) undesignated gaps in the route
   	 
Includes
 155 communities
 3 Great Lakes, touching a fourth, Lake Superior
 520 waterfront parks and natural areas
 42 Provincial Parks
 6 National Parks and 23 national historical sites
 239 beaches, including 21 Blue Flag Beaches
 152 arts and culture heritage attractions
 37 major annual waterfront festivals
 170 marinas and yacht clubs
 21 Bike Friendly Communities
 50+ major connecting trails

See also
 Martin Goodman Trail
 Bruce Trail
 List of rail trails in Canada

Footnotes

External links

 The Waterfront Trail Official Site
  The Waterfront Trail Artists
 Entry at Ontario Trails database
 City of Toronto cycling map
 Entry at Waymarked Trails, based on OpenStreetMap data.

Bike paths in Ontario
Hiking trails in Ontario
Lake Ontario
Niagara-on-the-Lake
Tourist attractions in Toronto
Transport in Algoma District
Transport in Bracebridge, Ontario
Transport in Bruce County
Transport in Brockville
Transport in Chatham-Kent
Collingwood, Ontario
Transport in Elgin County
Transport in Essex County, Ontario
Transport in Greater Sudbury
Transport in Grey County
Haldimand County
Transport in Lambton County
Transport in the District Municipality of Muskoka
Transport in Norfolk County, Ontario
Transport in Owen Sound
Parry Sound, Ontario
Transport in Parry Sound District
Transport in Sarnia
Transport in Sault Ste. Marie, Ontario
Transport in Simcoe County
Transport in Sudbury District
St. Joseph Island (Ontario)
Bike paths in Windsor, Ontario
Transport in Windsor, Ontario